The voiceless alveolar, dental and postalveolar plosives (or stops) are types of consonantal sounds used in almost all spoken languages. The voiceless dental plosive can be distinguished with the underbridge diacritic,  and the postalveolar with a retraction line, and the Extensions to the IPA have a double underline diacritic which can be used to explicitly specify an alveolar pronunciation, .

The  sound is a very common sound cross-linguistically. Most languages have at least a plain , and some distinguish more than one variety.

There are only a few languages which distinguish dental and alveolar stops, Kota, Toda, Venda and many Australian Aboriginal languages being a few of them.

Features

Here are features of the voiceless alveolar stop:

 There are three specific variants of :
 Dental, which means it is articulated with either the tip or the blade of the tongue at the upper teeth, termed respectively apical and laminal.
 Denti-alveolar, which means it is articulated with the blade of the tongue at the alveolar ridge, and the tip of the tongue behind upper teeth.
 Alveolar, which means it is articulated with either the tip or the blade of the tongue at the alveolar ridge, termed respectively apical and laminal.

Varieties

Occurrence

Dental or denti-alveolar

Alveolar

Variable

See also
 Index of phonetics articles

Notes

References

External links
 

Alveolar consonants
Pulmonic consonants
Voiceless oral consonants
Central consonants